Quinton Spears (born May 11, 1988) is a former American football linebacker of the National Football League (NFL). He was a 3-year-letter wide receiver at Montgomery High School in Montgomery, Texas, and received a scholarship to Prairie View A&M University where he was switched to tight end and finally defensive line. While at Prairie View A&M, Spears was a unanimous preseason All-SWAC first-team selection as a defensive end in 2009.

Professional career

Cleveland Browns
Spears was claimed by Cleveland Browns off waivers from Miami Dolphins and moved from defensive end to linebacker on September 4, 2011.

Indianapolis Colts
Spears signed a reserve/futures contract with the Indianapolis Colts on December 31, 2012. On August 13, 2013, he was waived-injured by the Colts. On the next day, he cleared waivers and was placed on the Colts' injured reserve list.  On September 10, 2013 the Indianapolis Colts waived linebacker Quinton Spears (hamstring) from injured reserve.

Dallas Cowboys
The Dallas Cowboys signed Spears to a futures contract on January 8, 2014.  On May 12, 2014 the Dallas Cowboys released Quinton Spears.

References

External links
 Indianapolis Colts bio

1988 births
Living people
American football linebackers
American football defensive ends
Prairie View A&M Panthers football players
Miami Dolphins players
Cleveland Browns players
Players of American football from Texas
People from Huntsville, Texas